The Nickelodeon Kids Choice Awards Argentina 2012 took place on 5 October 2012 at 19:00 hrs (Argentine Time) in the Microestadio Malvinas Argentinas in the city of Buenos Aires. Favio Posca was presented as host. In this edition, 15 categories were launched, one category more than last year.
The musical performances during the awards were telecast: Big Time Rush, Eme 15 (from the hit teen drama Miss XV), Miranda!, Axel and Rock Bones (from the Disney XD series Peter Punk) of performances during the broadcast of the event, and each sang a medley of some of his/her latest hits.
As in previous years, voting was conducted online through the official website of the program. In addition, through the network of Facebook page, one can also vote through Facebook accounts 'fans' first channel.

Presenters

Host 
 Favio Posca

Presenters 
 Agustina Cordova
 Benjamin Rojas
 Beto Cuevas
 Danna Paola
 Franco Masini
 Gaston Soffritti
 Germán Paoloski
 Gigantes del Catch
 Isabella Castillo and Andrés Mercado
 Jenny Williams
 Jorge Blanco
 Lucía Precul
 Macarena Paz
 Martina Stoessel
 Mercedes Lambre
 Mex Urtizberea
 Pablo Espinosa
 Rodrigo Noya
 Roger Gonzalez
 The Wanted
 Victoria Justice
 Violeta Urtizberea

Music performances 
 Miranda!
 Rock Bones
 Axel
 Eme 15
 Big Time Rush

Categories

Favourite TV Show

Favourite Actress

Favourite Villain

Favourite Cartoon

Favourite Animated Movie

International Artist or Group

Favourite Song

Favourite Video Game

International TV Show

Favourite Actor

Revelation

Favourite Radio Program

Favourite Movie

Favourite Latin Artist or Group

Deportist of the Year

Pro-Social Award

References

Nickelodeon Kids' Choice Awards